Mueang Pathum Thani is the capital district (amphoe mueang) of Pathum Thani province, central Thailand.

History
In the past, the district was called Bang Kadi District after the name of central tambon, as required by the Law of 1897. The district office was on the east bank of the Chao Phraya River. The office was moved to Tambon Parok, on the west bank of the river, in 1917. On 25 June 1938, the interior ministry changed the name of the district to "Mueang Pathum Thani District" in keeping with a decree of Rama VIII.

Geography
Neighboring districts are (from the west clockwise): Lat Lum Kaeo, Sam Khok, Khlong Luang, Thanyaburi, and Lam Luk Ka of Pathum Thani Province; Don Mueang of Bangkok; and Pak Kret of Nonthaburi province.

Administration
The district is divided into 14 sub-districts (tambons), which are further subdivided into 81 villages (mubans). The town (thesaban mueang) of Pathum Thani covers tambon Bang Prok and two additional municipal areas: the townships (thesaban tambons) Bang Luang and Bang Kadi. Bang Kadi covers the whole same-named tambon, Bang Luang covers parts of tambons Bang Luang, Ban Chang, and Bang Duea. There are twelve tambon administrative organizations (TAO) responsible for the non-municipal areas.

Education
 The Global Indian International School is in Ban Khayaeng.

References

External links
https://web.archive.org/web/20070212183724/http://www.muangpathumthani.com/ District website (Thai)

Mueang Pathum Thani